Eupelix cuspidata is a species of true bug belonging to the family Cicadellidae.

It is native to Europe.

References

Cicadellidae